The 2018 Navy Midshipmen football team represented the United States Naval Academy in the 2018 NCAA Division I FBS football season. The Midshipmen were led by eleventh-year head coach Ken Niumatalolo and played their home games at Navy–Marine Corps Memorial Stadium. Navy was a member of the American Athletic Conference (AAC) in the West Division. The Midshipmen finished the season 3–10, the team's worst record since 2002. They went 2–6 in AAC play to tie fifth place in the West Division.

Previous season
The Midshipmen finished the 2017 season 7–6 overall and 4–4 in AAC play to tie for third place in the West Division. They were invited to the Military Bowl where they defeated Virginia.

Preseason

Award watch lists
Listed in the order that they were released

AAC media poll
The AAC media poll was released on July 24, 2018, with the Midshipmen predicted to finish in third place in the AAC West Division.

Schedule

Personnel

Coaching staff

Roster

Depth chart

Depth Chart 2018
True Freshman
Double Position : *

Game summaries

at Hawaii

Memphis

Lehigh

at SMU

at Air Force

Temple

Houston

vs. Notre Dame

at Cincinnati

at UCF

Tulsa

at Tulane

vs. Army

References

Navy
Navy Midshipmen football seasons
Navy Midshipmen football